Shanghai Ocean University is a public university in Shanghai, China.

The university changed its name to the current name on 6 May 2008, authorized by the Ministry of Education The People's Republic of China, and the whole school was to be moved to Lingang New City in August 2008. Its former name is Shanghai Fisheries University (上海水产大学). It is a Chinese state Double First Class University Plan university, approved by the Ministry of Education.

As of 2021, the U.S. News & World Report ranks Shanghai Ocean University at 499th among the best universities in Asia. The university ranked no.1 nationwide in "Marine fisheries science and technology" in the recognized Best Chinese Universities Ranking.

History
Founded in 1912, Shanghai Ocean University was on the bank of the Huangpu River, with an area of 700,000 square meters. The university is characterized by aquaculture, food science, fishery economics, fishery laws, and stresses the coordinated development of multiple disciplines and expertise in agriculture, science, engineering, economics, arts and management.

Academics
The university consists of nine schools: Fishery, Oceanology, Food Science, Economics and Trade, Information, Humanities, Further Education, Vocational and Technical Education, AIEN (Sino-Australian Cooperated).

In addition to one state-level key discipline, two municipal-level key disciplines, three department-level key disciplines, and the right of conferring doctorate of aquaculture (the first level state discipline which covers two second-level disciplines), the university has 14 graduate programs, 23 undergraduate specialties and 18 specialties for junior college students. There are 10000 regular students (including Ph.D. students, graduates, undergraduates and students of higher vocational school) and 3700 students for further education. Of the staff members 200 teachers hold senior academic titles (professor and associate professor). The Shanghai Ocean University library has a collection of 460,000 books featured with fishery science.

The university takes the nationwide lead in such academic fields as Ichthyology, Aquatic Animal Proliferation and Breeding, Fish Diseases Prevention, Fish Nutrition and Feeds, Fish Species and Quality Resources, Seaweed Cells Engineering, Fishing Gear and Methodology, Fishery Machinery, Preservation and Management of Fishery Resources, Fishery Regulations and Policy, Fishery Economics, Biological Technology, Marine Ecology, Food Science and Engineering, Refrigeration and Cryogenics.

International presence
Shanghai Ocean University has made agreeable advances in international cooperation and communication. It has enrolled many international students who are pursuing doctorate or graduate and undergraduate degrees. As for the training courses and further education, subjects as Chinese Techniques of Aquatic Breeding, Development of Marine Fishery and Preservation of Fishery Resources, Chinese Language, Chinese Traditional Culture have formed their own features and gained their own advantages. Up to now the university has established long-term academic cooperation with more than 40 foreign institutions of higher education and research.

Following the school spirit of Solidarity, Dedication, Reality and Originality, the university is determined to keep pace with the worldwide competition, strive to build itself into a first-rate university famous at home and abroad for its featured multidisciplinary development in teaching and scientific research.

Campuses

 Jungong Road Campus: 334 Jungong Road, 200090, Yangpu District, Shanghai, China
 Xuehai Road Campus: 100 Xuehai Road, 201300, Nanhui District, Shanghai, China
 Lingang Campus: 999 Huchenghuan Road, 201306, Pudong District, Shanghai, China

References

External links
 Official website in Chinese
Official website in English

Universities and colleges in Shanghai
Maritime colleges in China
Fisheries and aquaculture research institutes